Sándor Hódosi (born 28 April 1966 in Budapest) is a Hungarian sprint canoeist who competed in the late 1980s. At the 1988 Summer Olympics in Seoul, he won a gold in the K-4 1000 m event.

Hódosi also won three medals at the ICF Canoe Sprint World Championships with two golds (K-2 10000 m and K-4 1000 m: both 1989) and a bronze (K-2 10000 m: 1987).

References
DatabaseOlympics.com profile

External links

1966 births
Canoeists at the 1988 Summer Olympics
Hungarian male canoeists
Living people
Olympic canoeists of Hungary
Olympic gold medalists for Hungary
Canoeists from Budapest
Olympic medalists in canoeing
ICF Canoe Sprint World Championships medalists in kayak

Medalists at the 1988 Summer Olympics
20th-century Hungarian people